The Peace River is a river in the southwestern part of the Florida peninsula, in the U.S.A. It originates at the juncture of Saddle Creek and Peace Creek northeast of Bartow in Polk County and flows south through Fort Meade (Polk County) Hardee County to Arcadia in DeSoto County and then southwest into the Charlotte Harbor estuary at Punta Gorda in Charlotte County. U.S. Highway 17 runs near and somewhat parallel to the river for much of its course. The river was called Rio de la Paz (River of Peace) on 16th century Spanish charts. It appeared as Peas Creek or Pease Creek on later maps. The Creek (and later, Seminole) Indians call it Talakchopcohatchee, River of Long Peas. Other cities along the Peace River include Fort Meade, Wauchula and Zolfo Springs.

Fresh water from the Peace River is vital to maintain the delicate salinity of Charlotte Harbor that hosts several endangered species, as well as commercial and recreational harvests of shrimp, crabs, and fish. The river has always been a vital resource to the people in its watershed. Historically, the abundant fishery and wildlife of Charlotte Harbor supported large populations of people of the Caloosahatchee culture (in early historic times, the Calusa). Today, the Peace River supplies over six million gallons per day of drinking water to the people in the region. The river is also popular for canoeing.

There were many Pleistocene and Miocene fossils found throughout the Peace River area, eventually leading to the discovery of phosphate deposits. Most of the northern watershed of the Peace River comprises an area known as the Bone Valley.

The Peace River is a popular destination for fossil hunters who dig and sift the river gravel for fossilized shark teeth and prehistoric mammal bones. Several campgrounds and canoe rental operations cater to fossil hunters, with Wauchula, Zolfo Springs, and Arcadia being the main points of entry.

Gallery

List of crossings

See also
Kissingen Springs
 South Atlantic-Gulf Water Resource Region

References 

 O'Donnell, Brian. (1990) "Peace River," in Marth, Del and Marty Marth, eds. The Rivers of Florida. Sarasota, Florida: Pineapple Press, Inc. .

External links 
USGS Real-Time Water Data for Peace River at Zolfo Springs
USGS Real-Time Water Data for Peace River at Arcadia

Rivers of Charlotte County, Florida
Rivers of DeSoto County, Florida
Rivers of Hardee County, Florida
Rivers of Polk County, Florida
Bartow, Florida
Rivers of Florida